Collin van Eijk (born 29 August 1991) is a Dutch footballer, who plays for Belgian side Eendracht Termien.

Club career
Van Eijk played in the Roda JC youth academy and made his professional debut as a late sub for Mads Junker in the 2010-11 Eredivisie season against FC Twente. He then joined MVV Maastricht in summer 2011. He later moved abroad to play in Belgium for Spouwen-Mopertingen after spending half a season at Dutch amateur outfit EHC/Heuts. He was replaced as Spouwen's first keeper by Tom Grootaers in February 2017 and subsequently left the club.

References

External links
 

1991 births
Living people
Sportspeople from Heerlen
Association football goalkeepers
Dutch footballers
Roda JC Kerkrade players
MVV Maastricht players
Eredivisie players
Dutch expatriate footballers
Expatriate footballers in Belgium
Dutch expatriate sportspeople in Belgium
EHC Hoensbroek players
Footballers from Limburg (Netherlands)